MV Caedmon was an Isle of Wight 'C' class ro-ro vehicle and passenger ferry. She operated for ten years on the Portsmouth to Fishbourne route before transferring to Wightlink's route from Lymington to Yarmouth. After 37 years of service, she was broken up in 2010.

History
MV Caedmon was built in 1973 for Sealink by Robb Caledon Shipbuilders Ltd in Dundee, Scotland. The ship was named 'Caedmon' after the Anglo-Saxon poet Cædmon.

Caedmon served on the Portsmouth to Fishbourne route for the first ten years of her life. For several weeks in 1979, she operated as a single-ended vessel after her prow was washed away during a storm.

All three passed to Wightlink after the privatisation of Sealink in 1984.

In 2008–09, on the introduction of three new Wight class ferries on the Lymington to Yarmouth route, the three 'C' class ships were withdrawn from service. They were sold for scrapping and initially laid up at Marchwood,, before being towed to Esbjerg, in Denmark. Cenred, Caedmon and then Cenwulf were dismantled at Smedegaarden in May 2010.

Layout

The car deck had a ramp fore and aft, allowing full ro-ro operation. The under car deck passenger accommodation cabins on all three boats, was not used for the last 20 years.

Twin 6-cylinder turbocharged Mirrlees Blackstone engines mounted at 45 degrees across each engine room drove Voith Schneider cycloidal propellers.

Unlike the earlier pioneer C-class ship Cuthred, the main engines were not additionally loaded by a generator, so larger Voith Schneider units were fitted and there was considerably more propulsive power.

Electrical supply was provided by two 6-cylinder Dorman/ English Electric gensets.

Footnotes

External links

 Wightlink Website - Wightlink.co.uk
 Image gallery prior to breaking

Ferries of England
Ferry transport on the Isle of Wight
1973 ships